America Abroad was a monthly documentary radio program produced by America Abroad Media (AAM), a Washington D.C.-based non-profit organization. The program was distributed by Public Radio International (PRI) and broadcast on public radio stations around the United States. Former hosts include Madeleine Brand, Hari Sreenivasan and Ray Suarez. Each month, America Abroad worked with independent reporters from several countries.

America Abroad began broadcasting on February 1, 2003, with a program on the invasion of Iraq. The program was broadcast six times per year until it became a monthly program in September 2007. AAM was awarded $600,000 in 2007 by the Hewlett Foundation for its radio programing particularly America Abroad. America Abroad ended in 2018.

References

External links
 America Abroad Media
 America Abroad at Public Radio International
 America Abroad

Public Radio International programs
2003 radio programme debuts
American documentary radio programs

2018 radio programme endings